Britomart Delivering Amoretta from the Enchantment of Busirane is a 1824 oil painting on canvas by Swiss painter Henry Fuseli. It depicts a scene from Edmund Spenser's poem The Faerie Queene in which the female knight Britomart frees Amoretta, a beautiful woman, from her captivity at the hands of Busirane, an evil sorceror. 

In Fuseli's painting, Britomart is swinging her sword as if to kill Busirane, but in the poem, Amoretta stops Britomart from slaying Busirane, as he is the only one who can break the magic which is holding her captive. 

The painting has been in the collection of the Freies Deutsches Hochstift since 1957.

See also 
 Britomart Redeems Faire Amoret, an 1833 painting by William Etty depicting the same scene

References

Sources 

 
 

1824 paintings
Paintings by Henry Fuseli
Romantic paintings
Works based on The Faerie Queene